Sagas are prose stories and histories composed in Iceland and to a lesser extent elsewhere in Scandinavia.

Sagas may also refer to:

 Sagàs, a town and municipality in Catalonia, Spain
 Sagas (album), a 2008 album by the band Equilibrium
 Dragon Ball Z: Sagas, a 2005 video game

See also
 Saga (disambiguation)